Stanley Osher (born April 24, 1942) is an American mathematician, known for his many contributions in shock capturing, level-set methods, and PDE-based methods in computer vision and image processing. Osher is a professor at the University of California, Los Angeles (UCLA), Director of Special Projects in the Institute for Pure and Applied Mathematics (IPAM) and member of the California NanoSystems Institute (CNSI) at UCLA.

He has a daughter, Kathryn, and a son, Joel.

Education
 BS, Brooklyn College, 1962
 MS, New York University, 1964
 PhD, New York University, 1966

Research interests
 Level-set methods for computing moving fronts
 Approximation methods for hyperbolic conservation laws and Hamilton–Jacobi equations
 Total variation (TV) and other PDE-based image processing techniques
 Scientific computing
 Applied partial differential equations
 L1/TV-based convex optimization
Osher is listed as an ISI highly cited researcher.

Research contributions
Osher was the inventor (or co-inventor) and developer of many highly successful numerical methods for computational physics, image processing and other fields, including:
 High resolution numerical schemes to compute flows having shocks and steep gradients, including ENO (essentially non-oscillatory) schemes (with Harten, Chakravarthy, Engquist, Shu), WENO (weighted ENO) schemes (with Liu and Chan), the Osher scheme, the Engquist-Osher scheme, and the Hamilton–Jacobi versions of these methods. These methods have been widely used in computational fluid dynamics (CFD) and related fields.
 Total variation (TV)-based image restoration (with Rudin and Fatemi) and shock filters (with Rudin). These are pioneering -  and widely used - methods for PDE based image processing and have also been used for inverse problems.
 Level-set method (with Sethian) for capturing moving interfaces, which has been phenomenally successful as a key tool in PDE based image processing and computer vision, as well as applications in differential geometry, image segmentation, inverse problems, optimal design, Two-phase flow, crystal growth, deposition and etching.
 Bregman iteration and augmented Lagrangian type methods for L1 and L1-related optimization problems which are fundamental to the fields of compressed sensing, matrix completion, robust principal component analysis, etc.
 Overcoming the curse of dimensionality for Hamilton–Jacobi equations arising in control theory and differential games.
Osher has founded (or co-founded) three successful companies:
 Cognitech (with Rudin) 
 Level Set Systems
 Luminescent Technologies (with Yablonovitch)
Osher has been a thesis advisor for at least 53 PhD students, with 188 descendants, as well as postdoctoral adviser and collaborator for many applied mathematicians. His PhD students have been evenly distributed among academia and industry and labs, most of them are involved in applying mathematical and computational tools to industrial or scientific application areas.

Honors

 National Academy of Engineering (NAE), 2018
  William Benter Prize in Applied Mathematics, 2016. 
 Carl Friedrich Gauss Prize, 2014.
  John von Neumann Lecture prize from SIAM, 2013.
  Fellow of the American Mathematical Society, 2013.
 Plenary speaker, International Congress of Mathematicians, 2010
 American Academy of Arts and Sciences, 2009
 Fellow, Society for Industrial and Applied Mathematics (SIAM), 2009 
 Honorary Doctoral Degree, Hong Kong Baptist University, 2009
 International Cooperation Award, International Congress of Chinese Mathematicians, 2007 
 Computational and Applied Sciences Award, United States Association for Computational Mechanics, 2007
 Docteur Honoris Causa, ENS Cachan, France 2006
 National Academy of Sciences (NAS), 2005
 SIAM Kleinman Prize, 2005
 ICIAM Pioneer Prize, 2003
 Computational Mechanics Award, Japan Society of Mechanical Engineering, 2002
 NASA Public Service Group Achievement Award, 1992
 US-Israel BSF Fellow, 1986
 SERC Fellowship (England), 1982
 Alfred P. Sloan Fellow, 1972–1974
 Fulbright Fellow, 1971

Books authored

See also 
 James Sethian, co-developer of level-set methods.

References

External links
Osher's home page at UCLA

 

20th-century American mathematicians
21st-century American mathematicians
Computational fluid dynamicists
Jewish American scientists
1942 births
Living people
University of California, Los Angeles faculty
Numerical analysts
Courant Institute of Mathematical Sciences alumni
Fellows of the Society for Industrial and Applied Mathematics
Fellows of the American Academy of Arts and Sciences
Fellows of the American Mathematical Society
Members of the United States National Academy of Sciences
Scientific computing researchers
Brooklyn College alumni
21st-century American Jews